Elizabeth was launched at Hull in 1813. She made one round-trip to Bengal for the British East India Company (EIC). She was last listed in 1841.

Career
Elizabeth appears in Lloyd's Register for 1813 with T. Forest, master, Barkworth, owner, and trade Hull—West Indies.

EIC voyage: Captain Thomas Forrest sailed for Bengal on 22 May 1815 on a voyage for the EIC. He returned on 19 November 1816. 

On 17 February 1817 Forest again sailed for India, this time for Bombay, and under a license from the EIC. 

Elizabeth, Forest, master, arrived at Île de France on 23 June. Benson had been sailing from Bengal to London when she had had to put into Île de France leaky. There she had been surveyed and condemned.

On 15 January 1821 Elizabeth, Forest, master, had to put into Kinsale to unload. She had been on a voyage from Quebec, to London but had sustained damage and was leaky. 

In the early 1920s Barkworth sold Elizabeth to Brooks & Co., London. They then sailed her between England and Australia.

Elizabeth arrived at the Cape of Good Hope on 6 April 1826 on a voyage from Singapore to London. She had sailed on 1 February 1826 and in  she encountered James Scott, which had lost her mainmast, rudder, and boats. She had also had to jettison some of her cargo and put back to Batavia. Elizabeth had stayed with James Scott for three days and left her with her rudder shipped and pumps working.

Fate
Elizabeth is last listed in 1841. She is listed in 1842, but the entry is incomplete and struck out.

Citations

References
 

1813 ships
Age of Sail merchant ships
Merchant ships of the United Kingdom
Ships of the British East India Company